Assessment for Effective Intervention is a quarterly peer-reviewed academic journal that covers psychoeducational assessment. The editor-in-chief is Tyler L. Renshaw (Utah State University). It was established in 1979 and is published by SAGE Publications in association with the Hammill Institute on Disabilities.

Abstracting and indexing 
The journal is abstracted and indexed in:
 Contents Pages in Education
 Educational Research Abstracts Online
 Linguistics and Language Behavior Abstracts
 PsycINFO
 SafetyLit
 Scopus

External links 
 
 Hammill Institute on Disabilities

SAGE Publishing academic journals
English-language journals
Educational psychology journals
Quarterly journals
Publications established in 1979